The Gendarme Gets Married is the third installment of the Gendarmes series, starring again Louis de Funès and one more time Geneviève Grad as his daughter. This comedy film succeeds Gendarme in New York and is followed by three further installments.

Plot 
The gendarme Cruchot meets the widow Josepha. They quickly fall in love. But Cruchot's daughter doesn't like Josepha and is determined to prevent the wedding by all means necessary.

Cast
 Louis de Funès: Ludovic Cruchot
 Michel Galabru: Jérôme Gerber
 Jean Lefebvre: Lucien Fougasse
 Christian Marin: Albert Merlot
 Guy Grosso: Gaston Tricard
 Michel Modo: Jules Berlicot
 Geneviève Grad: Nicole Cruchot, daughter of Ludovic Cruchot
 Claude Gensac: Josépha Cruchot
 Mario David: Frédo
 Nicole Vervil: Madame Gerber, Jérôme's wife
 France Rumilly: the nun, "Soeur Clotilde"
 Bernard Lavalette: the dance teacher

References

External links
 
 
 The Gendarme Gets Married at Uni France

1968 films
French comedy films
1960s French-language films
Films directed by Jean Girault
Films set in Saint-Tropez
1960s police comedy films
1968 comedy films
1960s French films